Fresh Fruit in Foreign Places is the second album by Kid Creole and the Coconuts, released in 1981.

Overview
Fresh Fruit in Foreign Places is a concept album in the form of a musical travelogue. Describing the album's concept to The New York Times, band leader August Darnell said: 

Fresh Fruit in Foreign Places was reissued in 2002 by Universal Island Records with 12" mixes of "Table Manners" and "Que Pasa / Me No Pop I" (although the latter is not the full version; it has been edited down from 7:11 to 6:18). The album replaced the original mix of "Dear Addy" with the 1982 single remix.

Reception

Fresh Fruit in Foreign Places was very well received critically upon its release. New York Times pop music critic Robert Palmer called it "an extraordinary album" and "the freshest and most intelligent fusion of pop styles and dance rhythms in a long time". It was voted one of the best albums of the year in The Village Voices influential Pazz & Jop critics' poll, and was ranked among the top ten albums of 1981 by NME.

Track listing
All songs written by August Darnell except as indicated.

Personnel

The Cast
 Kid Creole, Coati Mundi, Peter Schott, Mark Mazur, Carol Coleman, Andrew Lloyd, Winston Grennon, Yogi Horton, Lori Eastside, Adriana Kaegi, Cheryl Poirier, Don Arnone, Theodore "Dutch" Robinson, Beverly Britton Brown, Don Hamilton, Angelica de la Luna, Erroll Cornin, Rubens Bassini, Sam Turner, Steve Kroon, David Charles, Conjunto Libre (Andy Gonzalez, Dan Reagan, Jerry Gonzalez, Manny Oquendo), Freddie Harris, The Charles Lagond's Horns, The Jill Jeffe's Strings, Dominic Cortese, Sal Gallina

Technical credits
 August Darnell – producer, concept (based on a story), arrangements
 Sugar-Coated Andy Hernandez – co-producer, orchestrations, arrangements
 Michael Zilkha – executive-producer
 Michael Frondelli – chief engineer
 Tony Wright – cover, art direction
 Al Smith, Randy Hoffman, Tommy Mottola – management

Charts

References

1981 albums
Kid Creole and the Coconuts albums
Island Records albums
ZE Records albums